Paines Cross Meadow is a  biological Site of Special Scientific Interest north-east of Heathfield in East Sussex.

This site is damp meadow on heavy clay with some areas of peat around springs. There are diverse invertebrates, including great green and  dark bush-crickets and common blue and gatekeeper butterflies.

The site is private land with no public access.

References

Sites of Special Scientific Interest in East Sussex